MV Waily was a Saint Vincent and the Grenadines-flagged bulk carrier owned by Treasure Marine Ltd. The vessel was involved in a collision with the Malaysian-flagged oil tanker MT Bunga Kelana 3 on 25 May 2010 in the Singapore Strait that caused a release of 2,000 tonnes of crude oil.

References

1983 ships
Maritime incidents in 2010
Oil spills in international waters
Bulk carriers